Prospect Park station (also known as Prospect Park–Moore station) is a station along the SEPTA Wilmington/Newark Line and Amtrak Northeast Corridor. Amtrak does not stop here; only SEPTA serves this station.  The station, located at Lincoln and Maryland Avenues in Prospect Park, Pennsylvania, includes a 44-space parking lot.  Like the nearby Norwood Station, Prospect Park Station is located right next to the town's library, in this case the Prospect Park Public Library. It is also located near the Borough Hall.

Prospect Park station was originally known as Moore station, and was built by the Philadelphia, Wilmington and Baltimore Railroad. According to the Pennsylvania Railroad Stations, Past & Present website, a property owner named Moore donated the property for this station. He did so, with the "condition" that the station should carry his family name for as long as it exists. The station was renamed to Moore by the Pennsylvania Railroad on April 1, 1932.

However, that same source indicates that the current station building is not the original PW&B structure. ("...the original PW&B station ... predated the station that still exists").  The current station building was constructed by the Pennsylvania Railroad.

Station layout
Prospect Park has two low-level side platforms with walkways connecting passengers to the inner tracks. Amtrak's Northeast Corridor lines bypass the station via the inner tracks.

References

External links

SEPTA - Prospect Park Station
Original Moore's PRR Station Photos
 Lincoln Avenue entrance from Google Maps Street View
 Station House from Google Maps Street View

SEPTA Regional Rail stations
Stations on the Northeast Corridor
Railway stations in Delaware County, Pennsylvania
Former Pennsylvania Railroad stations
Wilmington/Newark Line